was a Shinto shrine at MacRitchie Reservoir, Singapore. Built by the Japanese Imperial Army during the Japanese occupation of Singapore in World War II, the shrine was destroyed directly before British forces re-occupied Singapore.

Located deep inside the Central Catchment Nature Reserve (CCNR), the National Heritage Board (NHB) declared the site a historic site in 2002, although no plans have been made public so far to develop or make any significant changes to the site since the war.

History 
The Syonan Jinja (Light of the South Shrine) was envisioned to be a shrine that commemorated the many Japanese soldiers and military personnel who fell in the Japanese conquest of Singapore.

The construction of Syonan Jinja was significant. Major Yasuji Tamura, the commander of the Japanese 5th Division's Engineers Regiment and the man in-charge of the design and the construction of the Syonan Jinja, had envisioned for the shrine in Singapore to be best Shinto shrine in the whole of the southern areas of Asia that has come under Japanese occupation. It was also to be the second-greatest shrine of the Shinto faith after the Meiji Shrine in Tokyo, Japan.

Destruction 
Just before the Japanese officially surrendered on 15 August in 1945, they decided to destroy and burn the shrine to the ground in fear of its desecration by the returning British colonial forces.

Preservation 
The ruins of Syonan Jinja – now down to a few remaining support structures and broken pieces and chunks – can still be found in the dense tropical forest of the Central Catchment Nature Reserve (CCNR), in which includes the MacRitchie Reservoir.

The remnants of the old shrine were designated as a historical site by the NHB in 2002. However, the historical site remains inaccessible to the public due to the strong current deep stream and the presence of wild animals.

References

Gallery

External links 
Exploring the Ruins of Syonan Jinja at MacRitchie Reservoir

Japanese occupation of Singapore
20th-century Shinto shrines
Religious buildings and structures in Singapore
Shinto shrines in the Japanese colonial empire
Religious buildings and structures completed in 1942
1942 establishments in the Japanese colonial empire
1945 disestablishments in the Japanese colonial empire
20th-century architecture in Singapore